Ombuin is an O-methylated flavonol, a type of flavonoid. It is the 4',7-O-methyl derivative of quercetin. 

Ombuin can be found in species of the genus Erythroxylum. It can also be synthesized. Ombuin 3-sulfate can be isolated from Flaveria chlorifolia.

Glycosides 
Ombuin-3-rutinoside can be isolated from Phytolacca dioica, the ombu tree. Ombuin-3-O-rhamnosylglucoside can be found in Erythroxylum rufum. 
Other glycosides (ombuosides) :
 Ombuin 3-galactoside (C23H24O12, CAS number 69168-13-4)
 Ombuin 3-glucoside (C23H24O12, CAS number 158642-42-3)

References 

O-methylated flavonols